Augustin Drakpe   (born 8 December 2001) is a professional footballer who plays for Sparta Rotterdam. Born in the Netherlands, he plays for the Togo under-23 national team.

Career
Drakpe joined the academy at Sparta in 2013 and progressed through the age group teams before moving to Jong Sparta. He made his professional debut in the Eredivisie for Sparta Rotterdam on 22 April, 2022 in a 2-0 defeat against FC Twente. In May 2022 Drakpe signed a new contract with Sparta to keep him with the club until the summer of 2024, with the option of another season for the club.

International career
Born in the Netherlands, Drakpe is of Togolese descent. He was called up to the Togo under-23 national football team in 2021 for matches against Tajikistan and Malawi.

References

External links
 

2001 births
Living people
Footballers from Dordrecht
Togolese footballers
Togo youth international footballers
Dutch footballers
Dutch people of Togolese descent
Association football defenders
Sparta Rotterdam players
Eredivisie players